Isaac Richards (born 9 April 1999) is an Australian former professional footballer who played as a goalkeeper for Adelaide United. He left football to pursue a career in mixed martial arts

Club career

Adelaide United
On 14 December 2017, Richards signed a 1-year scholarship contract with Adelaide United. For the 2018 season Richards was awarded the prestigious Peter Nikolich Trophy for the SA National Premier League (NPL) Goalkeeper of the Year. In November 2018, at the age of 19, Richards' contract with Adelaide United was upgraded to a senior contract until the end of the season. In May 2019 his senior contract was extended for a further two years to May 2021.

On 2 October 2019, Richards made his professional senior debut being named in the starting lineup for Adelaide United in a FFA Cup semi-final fixture against the Central Coast Mariners. They would go on to win the match 2–1. Richards played the entirety of the match.

Richards made his A-League debut against the Central Coast Mariners on 22 December 2019.

In July 2020, Richards left football and Adelaide United to pursue a career in mixed martial arts.

Career statistics

Honours

Club
Adelaide United
FFA Cup: 2018,  2019
State League 1 U-20 Premiership: 2015
State League 1 U-20 Championship: 2015

Individual
Adelaide United Joint Youth Player of the Year Award (with C. Devereux): 2017-18
National Premier Leagues South Australia Awarded Goalkeeper of the Year: 2018

References

External links
 Isaac Richards at Soccerway

1999 births
Living people
Australian soccer players
Association football goalkeepers
A-League Men players
National Premier Leagues players
Adelaide United FC players
Soccer players from Adelaide